For the French politician born in 1949, see Jean Dufour.

Jean Dufour (26 March 1818 – 30 December 1883) was a French politician. He served as a member of the National Assembly from 1871 to 1876, representing Indre. He belonged to the Orléanist parliamentary group, Centre droit. He was a knight of the Legion of Honour.

References

1818 births
1883 deaths
People from Indre
Politicians from Centre-Val de Loire
Orléanists
Members of the National Assembly (1871)
Chevaliers of the Légion d'honneur